Awada is a surname. Notable people with the surname include:

Alejandro Awada (born 1961), Argentine actor
George Awada (born 1975), American ice hockey player
Hussein Awada (born 1990), Lebanese footballer
Joe Awada (born 1959), American poker player
Juliana Awada (born 1974), First Lady of Argentina